Österlen Fotbollförening is a Swedish football team from Skillinge, Simrishamn Municipality in the Division 1 Södra. They play their matches at the Skillinge Idrottsplats, Skillinge.

History
Österlen FF is a club formed in 2014, merging the club's Branteviks IF, Skillinge IF, and Rörums SK.

During their 2020 season, Österlen were crowned champions of the Division 2 Östra Götaland and were promoted to Division 1 Södra for the first time in their history.

Current squad

Staff
 Agim Sopi – Head Coach
 Ted Helmesjö – Assistant Coach
 Jonas Nilsson – Goalkeeping Coach

Achievements

League
Division 2 Östra Götaland
Winners (1): 2020
Division 3 Södra Götaland
 Winners (1): 2016

References

Football clubs in Skåne County
2014 establishments in Sweden
Association football clubs established in 2014